Jugovo Lake, also known as Borilovačko Lake is a lake of Republika Srpska, Bosnia and Herzegovina. It is located in the municipality of Zelengora.

See also
List of lakes in Bosnia and Herzegovina

References

Lakes of Bosnia and Herzegovina